Unit 367, Samson Unit, or Shimshon, was a special forces unit within the Israeli Defense Forces named after the biblical figure Samson.

History
Shimshon unit's modus operandi focused on undercover military operations against Palestinian militants in the Gaza Strip. 

Shimshon was disbanded in 1996 following the Oslo Accords. The Samson Unit had a "sister unit" Duvdevan, which operated in the West Bank.

Samson Unit's roles are believed to have included:
 Intelligence collection in the battlespace on an ongoing basis, as means to continuously know the area, and as preparation for upcoming operations.  Samson reportedly gathered intelligence for its and other units’ operations.
 Counter-terrorism operations in the Gaza Strip, which included psychological warfare and the arrest of key enemy combatants

References

Special forces of Israel
Military units and formations established in 1986
Military units and formations disestablished in 1996